AFMA may refer to:
 AdSense for Mobile Applications
 Air Force Manpower Agency
 American Film Marketing Association, now called the Independent Film and Television Alliance
 Americans For Medical Advancement
 Australian Financial Markets Association
 Australian Fisheries Management Authority
 Australian Football Media Association
 Autofocus Micro-Adjustment, a focus calibration feature of some Canon cameras